Cumulus is a type of cloud with the appearance of a lump of cotton wool.

Cumulus may also refer to:

Computing and technology
Cumulus (software), digital asset management software developed by Canto Software
Cumulus Corporation, a defunct computer hardware company
Cumulus Networks, a computer software company

Gliders
Reinhard Cumulus, glider
US Aviation Cumulus, motorglider

Other uses
Cumulus Media, a radio broadcasting company
Cumulus oophorus, cells which surround a human egg after fertilisation